Mexico women's national softball team is the national team for Mexico.  The team competed at the 1990 ISF Women's World Championship in Normal, Illinois where they finished with 2 wins and 7 losses.

The country's softball team finished fourth with a 3–2 loss to Canada in the bronze-medal game at The Tokyo Olympics. The games were Mexico's first foray into Olympic softball.

2020 Olympic roster

References

External links
Federación Mexicana de Softbol A.C. (Spanish)
International Softball Federation

Softball
Women's national softball teams
Softball in Mexico